Armstrong–Ringsted Community School District (A-R) was a school district headquartered in Armstrong, Iowa.

Its area included sections of Emmet, Kossuth and Palo Alto counties, and it served the communities of Armstrong and Ringsted.

It operated Armstrong–Ringsted Elementary School, Middle School, and High School.

History

At one point the district joined a grade-sharing arrangement, in which a school district sends its students to another district's schools, that had been already established between the Sentral Community School District and the North Kossuth Community School District. This new agreement began on July 1, 2012. At the same time Matt Berninghaus became the superintendent of Armstrong–Ringsted.

On July 1, 2014, Armstrong–Ringsted merged with the Sentral district to form the North Union Community School District. The merger passed in the Armstrong–Ringsted district by 291–42 and in Sentral by 78–18, and the approval was through a total of 86% of voters in both school districts.

References

External links
 

Defunct school districts in Iowa
School districts established in 1979
1979 establishments in Iowa
School districts disestablished in 2014
2014 disestablishments in Iowa
Education in Emmet County, Iowa
Education in Kossuth County, Iowa
Education in Palo Alto County, Iowa